Vincenzo Chiarenza (born 27 September 1954 in Termini Imerese) is a former Italian football coach and former player.

Career

Player
Chiarenza started his professional playing career in 1973–74 with Sampdoria in the Italian Serie A, then playing mostly at Serie B level with Brindisi, Avellino, Bari, Taranto, Triestina, Atalanta and Lazio. He successively played for Serie C2 teams Legnano and Novara before to retire from active football.

Throughout his career, Chiarenza made a total 43 appearances in the Italian Serie A, also scoring a goal.

Coach
Chiarenza spent the majority of his coaching career working in the Juventus youth system. In 2003, he succeeded long-serving youth coach Gian Piero Gasperini. He is credited with masterminding the Primavera squad's most successful period in the 2000s and bringing through players such as Antonio Mirante, Raffaele Palladino, Paolo De Ceglie, Domenico Criscito, Sebastian Giovinco and Claudio Marchisio, all of whom have made the first team at some point and the latter three making the senior national team as well. All have been Italian youth internationals and Marchisio, Criscito and Giovinco have broken into the senior team. Under him, the Primavera squad won all competitions in the age group, including the 2005–06 Campionato Nazionale Primavera, the 2006–07 Coppa Italia Primavera, two consecutive Supercoppa Primavera in 2006 and 2007 and winning the 2004-05 Torneo di Viareggio and reaching the final the following year. The Primavera have yet to win the championship since his departure.

In October 2008 he was appointed to his first senior managing role, replacing Nello Di Costanzo as head coach of Serie B club Ascoli. He was however fired only less than two months later due to disagreement with the club President.

References

1954 births
Living people
People from Termini Imerese
Italian footballers
Italian football managers
Serie A players
U.C. Sampdoria players
Atalanta B.C. players
U.S. Avellino 1912 players
S.S.C. Bari players
Taranto F.C. 1927 players
S.S. Lazio players
Udinese Calcio players
U.S. Triestina Calcio 1918 players
Novara F.C. players
Ascoli Calcio 1898 F.C. managers
Como 1907 managers
Association football defenders
Footballers from Sicily
Sportspeople from the Province of Palermo